is a Japanese professional mixed martial artist who last competed in the Lightweight division of ONE FC. A professional MMA competitor since 2005, he has also competed for Vale Tudo Japan. He was the inaugural ONE FC Welterweight Champion.

Background
Suzuki is from Tokyo, Japan and began training in Kyokushin Karate when he was 15 years old after losing a street fight. He went on to become a five-time Heavyweight Champion, competing in various tournaments and championships. Unusually, despite being one of the top Welterweights in Asia he also has a full-time job as a legal assistant.

Mixed martial arts career

Early career
Suzuki began his professional career when he was 27 years old in 2005 against Sojiro Orui, the fight went to a draw because the time ran out. Suzuki then won his next three fights by knockout before having another draw this time against Petras Markevicius. Suzuki went on to win six more fights all ending by knockout, He was 9-0-2 before being defeated for the first time against UFC vet Keita Nakamura at Vale Tudo Japan 2012.

ONE Championship
After the loss Suzuki was picked up by ONE Championship, his first fight was against UFC veteran Phil Baroni, Suzuki won the fight via TKO after Baroni broke his ankle.

Suzuki was to get a shot at the inaugural ONE FC Welterweight Championship against Adam Kayoom at ONE Fighting Championship: Warrior Spirit. However, on November 11, 2013, ONE FC officials announced that Adam Kayoom was injured, and was going to be replaced by Vitor Pinto. However, Pinto was not medically cleared and the bout was cancelled.

Suzuki faced Brock Larson for the inaugural ONE FC Welterweight Championship on March 14, 2014 at ONE FC: War of Nations. He won the fight via unanimous decision.

In his first title defense, Suzuki faced Ben Askren on August 29, 2014 at ONE FC: Reign of Champions.  He lost the fight and title due to strikes in the first round.

Championships and accomplishments
ONE Championship
ONE FC Welterweight Championship (One time; first)

Mixed martial arts record

|Loss
|align=center|11−3−2
|Ev Ting
|TKO (punches)
|  ONE: Quest for Greatness
|
|align=center|1
|align=center|3:29
| Kuala Lumpur, Malaysia
|Lightweight debut.
|-
|Loss
|align=center|11−2−2
|Ben Askren
|TKO (punches)
|ONE FC: Reign of Champions
|
|align=center|1
|align=center|1:24
|Dubai, UAE
|
|-
|Win
|align=center|11−1−2
| Brock Larson
|Decision (unanimous)
|ONE FC: War of Nations
|
|align=center|5
|align=center|5:00
|Kuala Lampur, Malaysia
|
|-
| Win
|align=center| 10−1−2
| Phil Baroni
|TKO (punches)
|ONE FC: Rise to Power
|
|align=center|1
|align=center|4:17
|Pasay, National Capital Region, Philippines
|Welterweight debut.
|-
| Loss
|align=center| 9−1−2
| Keita Nakamura
|Submission (rear-naked choke)
|Vale Tudo Japan 2012
|
|align=center|1
|align=center|2:09
|Tokyo, Japan
|Catchweight (80 kg) bout.
|-
| Win
|align=center| 9−0−2
| Austin Judge
|KO (knee to the body)
|Zst: Zst 30
|
|align=center|1
|align=center|1:37
|Tokyo, Japan
|Middleweight debut.
|-
| Win
|align=center| 8−0−2
| Maurice Shelton
|KO (punch)
|Zst: Eighth Anniversary
|
|align=center|2
|align=center|4:29
|Tokyo, Japan
|
|-
| Win
|align=center| 7−0−2
| Uh Jin Jeon
|KO (knees)
|Zst: Battle Hazard 4
|
|align=center|1
|align=center|2:16
|Tokyo, Japan
|
|-
| Win
|align=center| 6−0−2
| Osami Shibuya
|KO (knees)
|Zst: Zst 22
|
|align=center|2
|align=center|4:03
|Tokyo, Japan
|
|-
| Win
|align=center| 5−0−2
| Yojiro Uchimura
|KO (knees)
|Zst: Battle Hazard 3
|
|align=center|2
|align=center|1:53
|Tokyo, Japan
|
|-
| Win
|align=center| 4−0−2
| Kestutis Smirnovas
| TKO (doctor stoppage)
|Zst: Zst 13
|
|align=center|1
|align=center|5:00
|Tokyo, Japan
|
|-
| Draw
|align=center| 3−0−2
| Petras Markevicius
|Draw (time limit)
|Zst: Zst 11
|
|align=center|2
|align=center|5:00
|Tokyo, Japan
|
|-
| Win
|align=center| 3−0−1
| Kenji Nagai
| KO (punches)
|Zst: Zst 10
|
|align=center|1
|align=center|1:37
|Tokyo, Japan
|
|-
| Win
|align=center| 2−0−1
| Kazuhiro Hanada
| KO (punch)
|Zst: Zst 9
|
|align=center|1
|align=center|4:01
|Tokyo, Japan
|
|-
| Win
|align=center| 1−0−1
| Yusuke Takahashi
| KO (punch)
|Zst: Swat! 3
|
|align=center|2
|align=center|1:19
|Tokyo, Japan
|
|-
| Draw
|align=center| 0−0−1
| Sojiro Orui
| Draw (time limit)
|Zst: Swat! 2
|
|align=center|2
|align=center|5:00
|Tokyo, Japan
|
|-

References

Living people
People from Tokyo
1977 births
Japanese male mixed martial artists
Japanese male karateka
Mixed martial artists utilizing Kyokushin kaikan
ONE Championship champions